"Yoshimi Battles the Pink Robots Pt. 1" is a song by the American alternative rock band The Flaming Lips, released as the second single taken from their 2002 album Yoshimi Battles the Pink Robots. It reached #18 in the UK Singles Chart as the highest-charting single from the album, after which the band made its debut appearance on Top of the Pops.

It is also a playable song in Rock Band 3 and Fantasia: Music Evolved with 2 remixes: Mumbai and Grimecraft. It is also one of the band's most popular songs they've played live, and it usually is accompanied by a massive sing along at Coyne's urging. During a concert in early 2014, Miley Cyrus and Coyne appeared on stage and sang the song together.

Track listing

DVD single
 "Yoshimi Battles the Pink Robots, Pt. 1" (video)
 "Yoshimi Battles the Pink Robots, Pt. 1"
 "Fish Fry & The Bigot's Drunk"
 "Galactic Melancholy"

UK CD1
 "Yoshimi Battles the Pink Robots, Pt. 1" 
 "Do You Realize??" (Scott Hardkiss Floating In Space Vocal Mix) 
 "Yoshimi Battles the Pink Robots, Pt. 1" (Japanese version)

UK CD2
 "Yoshimi Battles the Pink Robots, Pt. 1"
 "Can't Get You Out of My Head" (KEXP version) 
 "Yoshimi Battles the Pink Robots, Pt. 1" (Sessions @ AOL version)

Chart positions

References

2003 singles
The Flaming Lips songs
2002 songs
Warner Records singles
Songs written by Wayne Coyne
Songs written by Steven Drozd
Songs written by Michael Ivins
Songs about robots
Songs about fictional female characters
Cultural depictions of rock musicians
Cultural depictions of Japanese women